Cape Teall is a high, rocky cape forming the north side of the entrance to Mulock Inlet, along the west side of the Ross Ice Shelf. Discovered by the Discovery expedition (1901–04) and probably named for Sir Jethro Teall, Dir. of the Geological Survey and Museum of Practical Geology, of London, 1901–13.

Headlands of the Ross Dependency
Hillary Coast